
Year 300 (CCC) was a leap year starting on Monday (link will display the full calendar) of the Julian calendar. At the time, it was known as the Year of the Consulship of Constantius and Valerius (or, less frequently, year 1053 Ab urbe condita). The denomination 300 for this year has been used since the early medieval period, when the Anno Domini calendar era became the prevalent method in Europe for naming years.

Events 
 By place 

 Roman Empire 
 Emperor Diocletian begins construction of a palace that will become the city of Split (approximate date). Diocletian, who plans on abdicating, intends to use this palace as his place of retirement.
 Caesar Constantius I wins a victory over the Franks (approximate date).

 Asia 
 The lion becomes extinct from Armenia (approximate date).
 The Yayoi period ends in Ancient Japan (approximate date).
 Wootz steel is developed in India (approximate date).
 The Kama Sutra, an Indian handbook on the art of sexual love, is probably produced around this time by the sage Vatsyayana.
 Micheon becomes ruler of the Korean kingdom of Goguryeo.

 Africa 
 The elephant becomes extinct in North Africa (approximate date).
 The Atlas wild ass becomes extinct (approximate date).

 Mesoamerica 
 The Formative/Preclassic period in Mesoamerica comes to an end (around this year).
 The Mayan civilization reaches its most prolific period, the classic period, in what is now Guatemala, Belize and parts of southern Mexico adjacent to the former two. During most of this period, Tikal dominates the Mayan world.

 By topic 

 Art and Science 
 The magnetic compass for navigation is invented in China (approximate date).
 The Panchatantra, a Sanskrit collection of fables and fairy tales, is written in India.
 The Tetrarchs are probably made in Egypt. After 330 they are moved to Constantinople and in 1204 they are installed at the corner of the facade of the St Mark's Basilica, Venice (approximate date).
 Diocletian's Palace, Split, Croatia, is built. Its model is nowadays kept at the Museo della Civilta Romana, Rome.

 Religion 
 Peter of Alexandria becomes Patriarch of Alexandria.
 Possible date of the Codex Vaticanus Graecus 1209 and Codex Sinaiticus, manuscripts of the Bible written in Greek.
 Tiridates III makes his kingdom of Armenia the first state to adopt Christianity as its official religion.
 Approximate date of the Synod of Elvira in Elvira, Spain, which prohibits interaction with Jews, pagans, and heretics.

Births 
 Aemilia Hilaria, Gallo-Roman physician (approximate date)
 Flavius Hermogenes, Roman prefect and politician (d. 361)
 Frumentius, Syrian missionary and bishop (approximate date)
 Hilary of Poitiers, Gallo-Roman bishop (approximate date)
 Li Shou, Chinese emperor of the Cheng Han Dynasty (d. 343)
 Macarius of Egypt, Coptic Christian monk and hermit (d. 391)
 Min of Jin, Chinese emperor of the Jin Dynasty (d. 318)
 Zeno of Verona, Christian bishop and martyr (approximate date)

Deaths 
 Jia Mi, Chinese general, official and politician
 Jia Nanfeng, Chinese empress of the Jin Dynasty (b. 257)
 Liu Ling, Chinese scholar and poet (b. 221)
 Lüzhu, Chinese dancer, singer and music teacher
 Pan Yue, Chinese poet and writer (b. 247)
 Pei Wei, Chinese philosopher and politician (b. 267)
 Shi Chong, Chinese politician and statesman (b. 249)
 Sima Yu, Chinese prince of the Jin Dynasty (b. 278)
 Sporus of Nicaea, Greek mathematician (approximate date)
 Zhang Hua, Chinese official, scholar and poet (b. 232)

References